Tom Kempers and Jack Waite were the defending champions, but Kempers did not compete this year. Waite teamed up with José Antonio Conde and lost in semifinals to tournament winners Àlex Corretja and Fabrice Santoro.

Àlex Corretja and Fabrice Santoro won the title by defeating Hendrik Jan Davids and Piet Norval 6–7, 6–4, 6–3 in the final.

Seeds

Draw

Draw

References

External links
 Official results archive (ATP)
 Official results archive (ITF)

Campionati Internazionali di Sicilia
1995 ATP Tour
Camp